Bethan Dainton (born 12 April 1989) is a Welsh rugby league player who plays as  for Leeds Rhinos.
She formerly played rugby union as back row for the Wales women's national rugby union team and Harlequins Women in the Allianz's Premier 15s. She made her debut for the Wales national squad in 2016, and represented them at the 2021 Women's Six Nations Championship.

Club career 
Dainton has a long-established sporting career, having represented Wales in athletics and cross country in both Union and league codes. However, she did not begin playing rugby until 2015, when she was invited to play for the Dragon's sevens team by Wales player Gemma Rowland.

Dainton then played for Bristol Bears before signing with her current club, Harlequins Women in the Premier 15s .

International career 
After joining the Dragon's sevens team in 2015, Dainton represented Wales in both legs of the Rugby Europe Championship in Russia and France, where she helped Wales secure a place in the Women's Sevens World Series Qualifiers in Dublin, Ireland.

In January 2016, she was named in Wales' 28-woman squad for the 2016 Women's Six Nations Championship, and won her first cap in the opening game against Ireland.

A serious foot injury sustained on international sevens duty kept her out of action for nearly all of the 2017/18 season, and after a lengthy period of rehab she switched from wing to back row. Dainton then returned to the international scene as she was called up for the 2021 Women's Six Nations Championship. in Wales' opening game against France in the 2021 Women's Six Nations Championship

Dainton has won eight caps in her rugby career to date. She has won international caps in both the backs and the forwards.

Personal life 
Bombardier Dainton is enlisted in the British Army, serving with the 74th Battery of the 39th Regiment Royal Artillery. Over the winter of 2010–11, she was posted to Afghanistan, where her squadron provided precision artillery support to 16 Air Assault Brigade in Helmand Province. Dainton was one of 71 soldiers to be awarded their Operational Service Medals for Afghanistan at a ceremony in Newcastle in March 2011.

References

External links 
 

1989 births
Living people
Barbarian F.C. players
Bristol Bears Women players
British Army personnel of the War in Afghanistan (2001–2021)
Dragons RFC players
Dual-code rugby internationals
Footballers who switched code
Harlequins Women rugby players
Leeds Rhinos Women players
Royal Artillery soldiers
Rugby league players from Caerphilly
Rugby union players from Caerphilly
Wales national rugby league team players
Wales international rugby union players
Wasps Women rugby players
Welsh rugby league players
Welsh female rugby union players